The Colonarie River is the longest river in Saint Vincent and the Grenadines. Located on the main island of Saint Vincent, it flows from the northeast slopes of Grand Bonhomme peak in a northeastward direction, turning east before flowing into the Atlantic Ocean on the island's central east coast. The town of Colonarie is located on the banks of the river.

Rivers of Saint Vincent and the Grenadines